Quercus vulcanica is a species of flowering plant in the Fagaceae family. It is referred to by the common name Kasnak oak, and is a rare species of tree native to Lebanon, Syria, and Turkey. It is placed in section Quercus.

Quercus vulcanica is highly valued in its native region as a source of lumber and also as an ornamental. The bark is gray and fissured.

References

External links
 Quercus vulcanica - information, genetic conservation units and related resources. European Forest Genetic Resources Programme (EUFORGEN)

vulcanica
Flora of Lebanon
Flora of Syria
Trees of Turkey
Plants described in 1860
Ornamental trees
Garden plants of Asia
Taxa named by Pierre Edmond Boissier
Taxa named by Theodor von Heldreich
Taxa named by Theodor Kotschy